is a popular magical girl anime series. The manga was created by Tomô Inoue and Makiho Narita, while the 72-episode anime series was produced by Toei Animation between 1974 and 1975. This series is considered an important forerunner of the present day magical girl genre, as the series' characterization and general structure exerted considerable influence over future shows in the same genre. Most notably, several of the show's recurring motifs were recycled in Toei's Sailor Moon, AIC's Pretty Sammy, and (to a lesser degree) Wedding Peach.

Synopsis
Megu-Chan follows the experiences of a powerful (but accident-prone) young witch who comes to Earth as part of her initiation into larger society. Megu is a contender for the throne of the Witch World but knows very little of human relationships. Sent to Mid-World (Earth) in her early teens, she is adopted by Mammi Kanzaki, a former witch who gave up her royal ambitions to wed a mortal. Mammi bewitches her husband and their two children, Rabi and Apo, into believing that Megu has always been the eldest child of the family (the concept of using magic to alter memory would turn up again in future magical girl series, such as Majokko Tickle and Sailor Moon). Under Mammi's tutelage, Megu learns to control both her abilities and impulses in order to prove her worthiness for the crown.

This rite-of-passage subtext is continued throughout the series. A free spirit in the purest sense of the word, Megu-chan discovers emotions she'd never known existed – loneliness, compassion, grief, love, desperation, and (perhaps most importantly) self-sacrifice. As the story progresses, she proves the nobility of her character through the various trials and tribulations of youth, evolving from a willful and rather selfish little girl into a kind, generous, loving young woman. She battles monsters, demons, and rival sorcerers (including her nemesis, Non), but quickly realizes that her true enemy is the darker side of human nature.

Main characters
The European dub versions made generally minimal changes to the character names. In Italian, the only major name change was "Megu" to "Bia" (although "Non" became "Noa"), and Megu's family's name was changed from "Kanzaki" to "Giapo" (from "Giappone," the Italian spelling of "Japan"), "Chou-San"/"Cho-San" changed just only a bit and became "Ciosa" or "Ciosah", "Kurou" ("Crow"/"Claw") became "Cra Cra" from the Italian onomatopoeia of the song of the crows, "Furu Furu" cat was changed (as it was French) with the correct spelling of "Fru Fru" ("Frou Frou"). In the French dub, Mammi Kanzaki became "Mamine" Kanzaki, and Rabi and Apo became "Robin" and "Apolline" (the younger daughter was still called "Apo" for short).

Initially, Megu experiences severe difficulties adapting to 'normal' society, even at the simplest levels. Family relationships are completely beyond her. She argues with her Father and squabbles constantly with her younger siblings, Rabi and Apo, who love to play tricks on her. She confronts Boss, the school bully, in an escalating battle of wills and gets into trouble with her teachers. She falls in love with the new boy and weeps in secret when he returns to his home country. Basically, her behaviour resembles that of any other girl her age, given the social norms in mid-seventies Japan. As with the magical girl programs of the sixties, the main focus was on family and friendship; domestic disputes were normally handled with light-hearted humor. , Aurélia Bruno (French - Meg), Cinzia de Carolis (Italian - "Bia Giapo")

Blue-haired and pale-skinned, Non is one of the most powerful sorcerers of the Witch-World. Non is Megu's main contender for the crown; a cold, alien being almost devoid of emotion. Setting a precedent for many later mahou shōjo anime, Non attempts to murder Megu during their very first meeting and continues to plague her throughout the series. Eventually, Non comes to admire her rival's innate courage, even joining forces with her against mutual enemies (such as the demonic witch-queen Saturn and her devious henchman, Chou-san) in several episodes. While true friendship is never an option (in Non's view anyway), the two reach an uneasy truce by the middle of the series, agreeing to hold off their final confrontation (for possession of the throne) as long as possible, and by the end of the series, Non becomes far frequently a source of help than hindrance to Megu. , Hélène Chanson (French), Liliana Sorrentino (Italian - "Noa")

 Megu's adopted mother. , Dany Laurent (French - Mamine), Claudia Ricatti (Italian - "Mammi Giapo")

 Megu's adopted father. , Mario Pecqueur (French), Renzo Stacchi (Italian - "Sr. Giapo")

 Megu's adopted brother. , Gigi Lesser (French - Robin), Marco Guadagno (Italian - "Rabi Giapo")

 Megu's adopted sister. , Odile Schmitt (French - Apolline), Susanna Fassetta (Italian - "Apo Giapo")

 The school bully and Megu and Non's classmate. , Mario Pecqueur (French), Renzo Stacchi (Italian)

 An evil witch and the self-styled "Queen of Darkness". , Emanuela Fallini then Anna Teresa Eugeni (Italian - "Saturno")

 An agent of the witch queen sent to keep an eye on Megu and Non, but is secretly working for Saturn and intends to sabotage Megu's chances of winning the throne. , Hubert Drac (French), Armando Bandini (Italian - "Ciosa")

 Chou-san's underling. , Maïté Monceau (French), Susanna Fassetta (Italian - "Fru-Fru")

 Chou-san's underling. , Nino Scardina (Italian - "Cra-Cra")

 One of Megu's friends. 

 One of Megu's friends. , Francesca Guadagno (Italian)

Social commentary
The series dealt with subject matter considered too mature for young children at the time. Complicated social issues such as domestic violence, substance abuse and extramarital relationships were introduced, while loss and mortality frequently underscored Megu's hijinks. This was a major break from the traditional juvenile animation in both Asia and the West, perhaps explaining why the series did not find a European market until the early eighties.

Another point of departure was the series’ subtle eroticism. Majokko Megu-chan was born of a proposal by Hiromi Productions, which had previously produced the less successful magical girl series Miracle Shoujo Limit-chan (1973–74) with Toei, to create a magical-girl series with a slightly naughtier edge than previous shows of the genre. The influence of Megu-chan's Toei stablemate, Go Nagai's Cutie Honey, was apparent in several aspects, from the somewhat racy lyrics of the opening theme song (performed, as was Cutie Honeys, by Yoko Maekawa) to the fact that the two series shared many of the same staff. While not as overtly sexualized as Nagai's heroine, Megu-chan was surprisingly voyeuristic for its period. Megu was frequently depicted in various states of undress and the series featured scenes which anticipated the rise of so-called fan service anime; the opening theme song itself features lyrics in which Megu boasts about her breasts and her way of manipulating boys with her looks and coquettish behaviors. (The theme song lyrics were penned by lyricist Kazuya Senke, known for writing hit songs with similarly suggestive lyrics in 1973-74 for then-teenage J-pop idol Momoe Yamaguchi.)

Later kogaru heroines would capitalize on Megu's sexuality; it would, in fact, become a hallmark of the genre. There were numerous scenes in which Megu wore sheer nightgowns through which her underwear was plainly visible. Rabi had an arsenal tricks aimed at catching his "big sister" disrobed, from yanking the sheets off Megu's bed in the morning to using a fishing rod to lift her skirt.

Rabi was not the only voyeur Megu was forced to contend with; there was the vile Chou-san, an agent of the witch queen sent to sabotage Megu's chances of winning the throne. A stereotypical pervert in every sense of the term, Chou spent most of his time spying on Meg and devising ways to publicly humiliate her. In a memorable scene in episode 23, Chou-san rigged Megu's bathtub with wheels, causing it to race around the city while Megu was bathing. Earlier in that same episode, Chou attempted to trick Megu into taking off all of her clothes by hypnotizing her with a magical cuckoo clock; only Non's intervention at the last minute saved Megu from stripping herself totally naked. In another sequence, Chou-san breaks into the Kanzaki residence, hoping to abduct Megu in her sleep (fortunately she woke up in time and chased him out of the house). While his intentions were never stated explicitly, his underlying motivations were always made obvious.

Influence on Japanese popular culture
Megu-Chan was not the first magical girl anime, but it has been described as the first modern anime series to fall into the genre. Initially overlooked as a minor effort due its relative obscurity following its airing in the seventies, it nonetheless formed a template on which many later scenarios were based. Significantly, many of the show's plot devices were recycled in the enormously successful Sailor Moon (Toei, 1992–1997) – indeed, two later episodes of Megu-chan were directed by Yuji Endo, who later became one of the chief episode directors on Sailor Moon – and echoes of Meg's tempestuous rivalries can be perceived in seinen parodies such as the Project A-Ko franchise. The "fan service" angle would turn up again in countless other future series, such as Gainax's Neon Genesis Evangelion.

The program's impact on Japanese popular culture should not be underestimated; thematic descendants include the entire magical girl genre, along with some degree of bishōjo, lolicon and hentai material. Megu's effect on Japan's burgeoning manga industry has yet to be documented, but considering the vast number of shōjo titles currently available, it is safe to assume that Majokko Megu-Chan's animated adventures must have inspired at least a few of them.

International distribution and reception
The series gained moderate recognition after it reached the European market (with the heroine's name Anglicized to Meg in the French dub, and changed to Bia in the Italian, Portuguese, and Polish versions), but remains largely unknown in the English-speaking world, as it has never been officially translated into English.

The show also received a Spanish dub for the Latin American market, under the name of "Maggie, la brujita". The show, however, had little to no success in the region. It was broadcast in Peru and Venezuela in the early 80s, after which it was never aired again, and currently only a handful of episodes can be found with this dub.

Outside Japan, the series achieved its greatest popularity in Italy in the early 1980s (as Bia - la sfida della magia, or Bia - The Magical Challenge); however, the Italian dub skipped seven of the 72 episodes (hence the reason why some sources list the series as consisting of only 65 episodes) and also made a few edits for content in the extant episodes. The undubbed episodes were fairly dark, most of them dealing with suicide. The edits made in the Italian version carried over into the Polish and Portuguese versions, which were adapted from the Italian and not from the original Japanese.

Episodes
Of the anime's 72 episodes, 7 episodes were omitted from international releases and were never broadcast outside of Japan due to their controversial nature.

 Here Comes the Pretty Witch (April 1, 1974)
 That Girl's a Rival (April 8, 1974)
 Lots of Witches (April 15, 1974)
 Light of Our Home (April 22, 1974)
 Witch of Love (April 29, 1974)
 Papa Can't Afford to Laugh (May 6, 1974)
 My Longing for Meg (May 13, 1974)
 A Genius at Venting His Anger (May 20, 1974)
 Song of Sincerity (May 27, 1974)
 Marvelous Balloon Trip (June 3, 1974)
 Messenger From the Moon (June 10, 1974)
 Bow-Wow Riot (June 17, 1974)
 Duel! The Magical Mansion! (June 24, 1974)
 The Phantom Harp (July 1, 1974)
 Papa's Lover?! (July 8, 1974)
 From the Sky with Love (July 15, 1974)
 Meg Times Two (July 22, 1974)
 The Old Castle's Love Story (July 29, 1974)
 Goodbye, Mr. Ghost (August 5, 1974)
 Walk, Mill! (August 12, 1974)
 Ex-Witch Granny Chuck (August 19, 1974)
 When Do the Stars Fall Into the Sea? (August 26, 1974) (Japan-only) The Great Tearful Humiliation Operation (September 2, 1974)
 The Stolen Dress (September 9, 1974)
 The Phantom Boy (September 16, 1974) (Japan-only) The Great Magical Battle (September 23, 1974)
 The Curse of Scorpio (September 30, 1974)
 The Baby Scandal (October 7, 1974) (Japan-only) Tears of an Angel (October 14, 1974) (Japan-only) The Mysterious Abused Girl (October 21, 1974)
 Yodel of Love (October 28, 1974)
 Shadow of a Witch Fluttering Her Wings (November 4, 1974)
 Saturn's Messenger (November 11, 1974)
 Uninvited Guests (November 18, 1974)
 The White Horse, Upstairs in Our House (November 25, 1974)
 The Dolls That Left (December 2, 1974)
 The Strange Transfer Student (December 9, 1974)
 Paper Planes Bound Far Away (December 16, 1974)
 Santa's Name is Apo (December 23, 1974)
 The Great Tomboy Race! (January 6, 1975)
 The Lost Polar Bear (January 13, 1975)
 Friendship at the Snow Festival (January 20, 1975)
 The Snow Bird's Secret (January 27, 1975)
 The Age of Rebellion is Here (February 3, 1975)
 Red Shoes of Friendship (February 10, 1975)
 Tale of North Spring Winds (February 17, 1975)
 Spring in a Yacht (February 24, 1975)
 A Doll's Poem (March 3, 1975)
 Pinwheel's Song (March 10, 1975)
 The Flying Bag (March 17, 1975)
 Please Take Care of Taro (March 24, 1975)
 Gonbei Has Returned (March 31, 1975)
 The Magic World's Failure (April 7, 1975)
 Missing Cat (April 14, 1975)
 Who's the Criminal? (April 21, 1975)
 Secret of The White Lily (April 28, 1975) (Japan-only) Carp Streamers High in the Sky (May 5, 1975)
 Where Are You, Gonbei? (May 12, 1975)
 The Girl in The Rain (May 26, 1975) (Japan-only) Young Master's Great Circus (June 2, 1975)
 The Rainy Man (June 16, 1975)
 Due by Midnight, Bound for The Witch Kingdom (June 23, 1975)
 The Blue Star of Tanabata (July 7, 1975)
 The Fuss of Not Swimming (July 14, 1975)
 The Dreamy Trolley Car (July 21, 1975)
 Foggy Morning Paper, Taro (August 4, 1975) (Japan-only)'''
 The Guitar and the Boy (August 18, 1975)
 Nya-Nya! Summer Vacation! (August 25, 1975)
 Revenge Dog Sigma (September 8, 1975)
 Great Kite, Fly Me with the Sea Wind (September 15, 1975)
 Final Battle: The Greatest Magic! (September 22, 1975)
 Farewell, Meg (September 29, 1975)

Music
In episode 27, Megu watches Misty Honey from Cutie Honey on TV singing the Cutie Honey theme. The same vocalist, Yoko Maekawa, performed the theme songs for both Cutie Honey and Megu-chan.

The series also reused some incidental music from an earlier magical-girl series by Toei, 1970's Mahō no Mako-chan. Takeo Watanabe composed the music for both series.

Opening themeMajokko Megu-chan / Little Meg the Witch GirlLyrics: Kazuya Senke
Composition: Takeo Watanabe
Arrangement: Yuji Matsuyama
Performance: Yoko Maekawa

Ending themeHitori Bocchi no Megu / Megu is All Alone''
Lyrics: Toru Okato
Composition: Takeo Watanabe
Arrangement: Yuji Matsuyama
Performance: Yoko Maekawa

References

External links
 
 Toei Animation's Majokko Megu-chan page, in Japanese
 Bia - la sfida della magia at Shoujo Love (Italian)
 Little Witch Kingdom - Japanese website dedicated to Majokko Megu Chan, extensively illustrated throughout.
 

1974 anime television series debuts
Witchcraft in anime and manga
Magical girl anime and manga
TV Asahi original programming
Toei Animation television
Television series about witchcraft